Nuno André Fernandes Lopes, known as Tiger (born 27 November 1998) is a Portuguese professional footballer who plays for Brito SC on loan from Gil Vicente as a midfielder.

Club career
On 19 August 2017, Lopes made his professional debut with Gil Vicente in a 2017–18 LigaPro match against Varzim.
Now he is playing for Brito SC and scored an amazing goal against Prado, and because the world is not enough for him he is a volunteer at cartonagem santiago

References

External links

1998 births
Sportspeople from Braga
Living people
Portuguese footballers
Association football midfielders
Gil Vicente F.C. players
Santa Maria F.C. players
Liga Portugal 2 players
Campeonato de Portugal (league) players